Ramon d'Salva (born 1921; date of death unknown) was a Filipino actor who was known for villain roles and played in numerous films under his home studio Premiere Productions. He made his first film, ‘’Suwail’’, in 1949.

Filmography
1949 - Suwail [Premiere]
1949 - Kidlat sa Silangan [Premiere]
1949 - Dugo ng Katipunan [Premiere]
1949 - Hindi Ako Susuko [Premiere]
1949 - Ang Lumang Bahay sa Gulod [Premiere]
1950 - Ang Hiwaga ng Tulay Na Bato [Premiere]
1950 - Wanted: Patay o Buhay [Premiere]
1950 - Tatlong Balaraw [Premiere]
1950 - Ang Kampana ng San Diego [Premiere]
1950 - Punglo at Pag-ibig [Premiere]
1951 - Sa Oras ng Kasal [Premiere]
1951 - Kadakilaan [Premiere]
1951 - Santa Cristina [Premiere]
1951 - Bahay Na Tisa [Premiere]
1952 - Kalbaryo ni Hesus [Libran]
1952 - Salome [Consuelo]
1952 - Golem [Royal]
1953 - Tiyanak [Cinema Technician Inc.]
1953 - Pagsikat ng Araw [Maria Clara]
1953 - Sa Hirap at Ginhawa [Maria Clara]
1953 - Babaing Kalbo [Libran]
1954 - Guwapo [MV]
1954 - Goldiger [Deegar Cinema Inc.]
1954 - Ander De Saya [Larry Santiago]
1954 - Mr. Dupong [LGS]
1954 - Si Og sa Army [Larry Santiago]
1954 - Paladin [Premiere]
1954 - Pedro Penduko [Premiere]
1955 - Anak ni Palaris [Deegar Cinema Inc.]
1955 - D 1-13 [Premiere]
1955 - Ito ang Aming Daigdig [Fama]
1955 - El Jugador [Premiere]
1955 - Magia Blanca [Larry Santiago]
1955 - Tomboy [Filipinas]
1956 - Desperado [People's]
1956 - Takya [Balatbat & Balatbat]
1956 - Santa Lucia [People's]
1956 - Heneral Paua [Larry Santiago]
1956 - Buhay at Pag-ibig ni Dr. Jose Rizal [Balatbat & Bagumbayan]
1956 - Prinsipe Villarba [People's]
1956 - Haring Espada [People's]
1956 - Montalan Brothers [Larry Santiago]
1956 - Mrs. Jose Romulo [Larry Santiago]
1957 - Libre Comida [Balatbat]
1957 - Maskara [Premiere]
1957 - Bicol Express [Premiere]
1957 - Yaya Maria [Premiere]
1958 - Marta Soler [Premiere]
1958 - Kurangga [Cinematic Phils. Inc]
1958 - Matira ang Matibay [Tamaraw Studio]
1958 - May Pasikat ba sa Kano? [Premiere]
1958 - Sa Ngalan ng Espada [Premiere]
1958 - Mga Liham kay Tia Dely [Larry Santiago]
1958 - Ramadal [Premiere]
1958 - Sisang Tabak [Cinematic Phil Inc.]
1958 - Apat na Pulubi [Larry Santiago]
1961 - Noli Me Tángere
1964 - Ging
1967 - Batman Fights Dracula
1983 - E.T. Is Estong Tutong
1987 - Feliciano Luces: Alyas Kumander Toothpick, Mindanao
1988 - Ang Supremo
1992 - Jerry Marasigan, WPD
1992 - Lakay

External links

1921 births
2015 deaths
Filipino male film actors